The Ducati 450 R/T (road/trail) is a  single cylinder bevel drive desmodromic SOHC motorcycle produced by the Italian manufacturer Ducati from 1971 to 1974. Initially produced at the request of the American importers Berliner Motor Corporation as a pure motocross machine exclusively for the American Market, only a few hundred machines were made of this type. It is the only motocross bike to use desmodromic valves. An optional street equipment kit was available. From 1972 it was produced for the European Market as a street legal on/off road machine, which was sometimes known as the 450 T/S.

Total production was around 460 machines.

History
American desert racers Doug Douglas and Jim McClurg had won the inaugural Baja 500 on a modified 350 Ducati desmo in 1969. This prompted US importer requested a 450 off-Road racer to compete with the successful BSA B44 Victor. Ducati employed 1966 Italian scrambles champion Walter Reggioli to develop the new bike.

The tank, mudguards and side panels were of bright yellow fibreglass. Even with rubber-mounting, engine vibration and frame-flex caused the components to crack.

A street equipment kit was available which consisted of front and rear lights, wiring and handlebar switches. With the kit fitted the bike was not street-legal as it had no brake light, horn or silencer.

The engine was set too far back for the short wheelbase making the machine difficult to turn.

At the 1971 ISDT held at the Isle of Man, the Italian team used R/Ts, including three fitted with demo 350 cc engines. These machines had a modified steering head angle, high level twin silencers and a centre stand to ease changing wheels when punctured.

In 1972 the bike was offered with full street equipment. This included lights, horn, instruments, alternator, coil ignition and an ignition switch mounted in the headlight shell. A low level exhaust and Silentum silencer, as used on the Mark 3, was fitted. In 1974 electronic ignition was fitted.

Technical details

Engine and transmission
The single cylinder bevel drive OHC engine was of a vertically spilt unit construction and had alloy head and alloy barrels with austenitic liners. Ball bearings were used in the main bearings and roller bearings for the big end. The head used desmodromic valves. (A system where the valves are positively closed by extra lobes on the cam and levers rather than by a more conventional springs). Compression ratio was 9.3:1. and claimed power output was  @ 6,500 rpm.
A decompressor was fitted to aid starting and also as a method of stopping the engine as no ignition switch was fitted.

Fuel was delivered by a 29 mm Dell'Orto UHB carburettor. Wet sump lubrication was used. Ignition was initially by flywheel magneto. This was changed to battery and coil in 1972 and electronic ignition was fitted in 1974. 

Primary drive was by helical gears to a multi-plate wet clutch to a 5 speed gearbox. Chain drive took power to the rear wheel.

Cycle parts
The 450 R/T used a newly designed single downtube frame that shared several features with the 750 GT. Front suspension was by  diameter telescopic forks made by Marzocchi. Based on a design by Ceriani, they offered  of travel. A swinging arm was used on the rear with twin non-adjustable shock absorbers. The top of the shock absorbers could be attached in four different positions to adjust the rear suspension geometry. 3-way adjustable shocks were fitted from 1972.

Brakes were  diameter drums front and rear, the front being the same as the unit used on the Monza Junior. Wire wheels were fitted with Borrani alloy rims, and 400x21 front and 300x18 rear tyres.

350 R/T
A few 350 R/Ts were produced in 1971 and were fitted with the 350 desmo engine. In 1974 the R/T was available in the domestic Italian home market fitted with the non-demo engine of the Mark 3.

References

Bibliography

External links

450R/T
Dual-sport motorcycles
Motorcycles introduced in 1971
Single-cylinder motorcycles